José María Hipólito Figueres Ferrer (25 September 1906 – 8 June 1990) served as President of Costa Rica on three occasions: 1948–1949, 1953–1958 and 1970–1974. During his first term in office he abolished the country's army, nationalized its banking sector, and granted women and Afro-Costa Ricans the right to vote, as well as access to Costa Rican nationality to people of African descent. 

His son José María Figueres was also President of Costa Rica from 1994 to 1998.

Early life and career
Figueres was born on 25 September 1906 in San Ramón in Alajuela province. Figueres was the eldest of the four children of a Catalan doctor and his wife, a teacher, who had recently immigrated from Catalonia to San Ramón in west-central Costa Rica. Figueres' first language was Catalan.

In 1924 he left for Boston, United States, on a work and study trip. There he studied hydroelectric engineering at the Massachusetts Institute of Technology. Figueres returned to Costa Rica in 1928 and bought a farm in Tarrazú. He named the farm "The Endless Struggle".

Figueres became a successful coffee grower and rope manufacturer, employing more than 1,000 sharecroppers and factory laborers. Describing himself as a "farmer-socialist", he built housing and provided medical care and recreation for his workers and established a community vegetable farm and a dairy with free milk for workers' children.

His sharecroppers could either sell hemp grown on his plantation to him at market price for use in his rope factory, or sell it elsewhere if they were offered a better price.

Political career

Return to Costa Rica, the Caribbean Legion, and the Costa Rica Civil War (1944–1948)

When Figueres returned to Costa Rica in 1944 following two years in exile for criticising President Rafael Ángel Calderón Guardia, he established the Democratic Party, which a year later transformed into the Social Democratic Party. The party was intended to be a counterweight to the ruling National Republican Party (PRN), led by former President Calderón and his successor Teodoro Picado Michalski. The highly controversial Calderón had angered Costa Rican elites, enacting a large social security retirement program and implementing national healthcare.  Calderón was accused of corruption by the elites, providing a rallying cry for Figueres and the Social Democratic Party.

Figueres began training the Caribbean Legion, an irregular force of 700. Figueres launched a revolution along with other landowners and student agitators, hoping to overthrow the Costa Rican government. With plans of using Costa Rica as a base, the Legion planned next to remove the three Central American dictators.  Washington officials closely watched the Legion's activities, especially after Figueres carried out a series of terrorist attacks inside Costa Rica during 1945 and 1946 that were supposed to climax in a general strike, but the people did not respond.

Former President Calderón supporters prevented and invalidated the 1 March 1948 presidential election in which Otilio Ulate had allegedly defeated Calderón in his second term bid with fraud. In March–April 1948, the protests over the election results mushroomed into armed conflict, then into revolution. Figueres defeated Communist-led guerrillas and the Costa Rican Army, which had joined forces with President Picado.

With more than 2,000 dead, the 44-day civil war was the bloodiest event in 20th-century Costa Rican history.

Figueres as the provisional president (1948–1949)

After the civil war, Figueres became President at the head of a provisional junta, known as the Founding Council, that held power for 18 months. During that time he took several actions:

 abolishing the army (as a precaution against the militarism that has perennially thwarted or undercut democracy in Central America) Figueres said he was inspired to disarm Costa Rica by H. G. Wells "The Outline of History", which he read in 1920 while at MIT. "The future of mankind cannot include armed forces. Police, yes, because people are imperfect.", he declared. Ever since, Costa Rica has had no army and has maintained a 7,500-member national police force for a population of over five million.
 enabled women and illiterates to vote,
 put into effect basic welfare legislation,
 nationalised banks,
 outlawed the Communist Party,
 directed the writing of a new constitution,
 guaranteed public education for all,
 gave citizenship to black immigrants' children,
 established civil service to eliminate the spoils system in government, and

"In a short time, we decreed 834 reforms that completely changed the physiognomy of the country and brought a deeper and more human revolution than that of Cuba", Figueres said in a 1981 interview.

Once Figueres gained control, the legislation he passed regarding social reform was not that much different from Calderón's proposals. In fact, it is believed by some historians, such as David LaWare, that Figueres' social reforms were more or less the same as Calderón's Labor Code of 1943, with the primary difference being that Figueres had gained the power with which to enact the laws, holding the complete support of virtually all the country. Both of these leaders' programs were in many cases exactly like the ones Franklin D. Roosevelt passed during the Great Depression that helped lift the US out of its own economic slump and social decline it had faced in the 1930s.  Figueres admired what president Franklin D. Roosevelt did; however, he noted that "the price he had to pay to get his programs through was to leave the business community free overseas to set up dictatorships and do whatever they liked...What we need now is an international New Deal, to change the relations between North and South."

Figueres stepped down after 18 months, handing his power over to Otilio Ulate, and ever since Costa Ricans have settled their arguments constitutionally.

"Your hands are not clean to fight communism when you don't fight dictatorships", Figueres told American interviewers in 1951. "It seems that the United States is not interested in honest government down here, as long as a government is not communist and pays lip service to democracy."

Second term as President (1953–1958)
In 1953, Figueres created the Partido Liberación Nacional (PLN), the most successful party in Costa Rican political history, and was returned to power in 1953. He has been considered to be the most important political figure in Costa Rica's history.

During his various terms in office he nationalized the banking system and contributed to the construction of the Pan-American Highway that goes across Central America. He promoted the private industry sector and stimulated the national industry sector. He succeeded in energizing the country's middle class creating a strong buffer between the upper and lower classes.

What most alarmed U.S. officials was Figueres's material and moral support for the Caribbean Legion, even though Figueres had obviously lost interest in the Legion after he gained power. But Figueres still criticized U.S. support for the dictators, going so far as to boycott the 1954 inter-American meeting because it was held in Caracas, where President of Venezuela Marcos Pérez Jiménez, a military ruler, held sway.

Figueres happily cooperated with North American military plans.  After the United States established the School of the Americas in the Panama Canal Zone to train Latin American officers in Anti-Communist techniques, more Costa Rican "police" graduated from the School between 1950 and 1965 than did officers of any other hemispheric nation except Nicaragua.

Border war with Somoza's Nicaragua (1954–1955)
Figueres's support for the Caribbean Legion nearly cost him his job during this second presidency. Implicated in an invasion of Nicaragua in April 1954 by anti-Somoza exiles linked to the Caribbean Legion, Anastasio Somoza García launched a counter-attack, allowing the exiled former Costa Rica president Rafael Calderón to invade Costa Rica in January 1955.

Figueres had played a dangerous game, but he had also abolished the Costa Rican army, which forced him to appeal to the Organization of American States to protect his country from Somoza's aggression. The OAS, with the concurrence of the U.S. representative, ordered a cease-fire and sent a delegation to Costa Rica for an on-site investigation.

At that point, Somoza realized that he had to act quickly. He called in his IOU from the CIA. He had permitted the CIA to use Las Mercedes Airport, outside Managua, as a base for its P-47s during the Guatemalan intervention. Now he wanted the planes that were parked there to help him in his feud with Figueres.

On 15 January, three days after the OAS action, a P-47 Thunderbolt violated Costa Rican airspace and bombed and strafed a number of Costa Rican towns.

Figueres, alarmed by this escalation, pointed out that Costa Rica had no defense against "modern weapons" of this kind and again appealed to the OAS. The council of the organization immediately authorized the United States to sell four P-51 Mustang fighters to Costa Rica for a dollar apiece.

The State Department, responding to pressure from certain U.S. congressmen and sensing an opportunity to improve America's image in Latin America after Guatemala, came to the rescue and preserved the Caribbean's "lone democrat." Its gesture ended the "invasion", and the State Department scored one over the CIA. The Nicaraguan dictator withdrew, but not before extracting a commitment from Figueres that he would sever links with the exiles.

1958 testimony before U.S. Congress
In 1958, during a visit to Caracas, Venezuela, U.S. Vice President Richard Nixon was spat at by anti-American protesters who also disrupted and assaulted Nixon's motorcade, pelting his limousine with rocks, shattering windows, and injuring Venezuela's foreign minister. The event prompted the United States Congress to create a special committee to investigate the reasons behind it. Many people were invited to speak before it, including Figueres, who testified on 9 June 1958. Figueres condemned the Venezuelans, but said that he understood them, criticising the United States for their support of Rafael Trujillo, resource extraction, and enabling of corruption and autocracy.

Third presidential term (1970–1974)
The termination of Alliance for Progress funds as well as the collapse of the Central American Common Market, threatened to cripple the country's economy until Figueres discovered a new market by selling 30,000 tons of coffee to the Soviet Union in 1972. Costa Rica then became the only Central American nation to establish diplomatic relations with Moscow.  The World Bank and International Monetary Fund also delivered millions of dollars to keep the economy afloat.

When opponents of Nicaragua's President Anastasio Somoza Debayle seized a plane in San José in 1971, the 1.60 metre Figueres stood on the runway and aimed a submachine gun at the cabin until the hijackers surrendered. By his own account, he also nearly ruined a 1973 Central American summit when he lambasted five army generals, saying, "Isn't it odd that all you bastards are generals, and I'm the only civilian, but I'm the only one who's ever fought a war?"

Political connections

KGB

According to revelations from the Mitrokhin Archive, the KGB secretly transmitted to Figueres a $300,000 loan via the Costa Rican Communist Party to help finance his 1970 campaign, in exchange for establishing diplomatic relations with the Soviet Union, which he did upon election. Figueres later escalated his relationship with the San Jose residency of the KGB, expanding his activities to providing confidential reports on other countries in Central America and the Caribbean.

In 1974, a KGB report to Leonid Brezhnev revealed that Figueres had agreed to publish materials advantageous to the KGB. For this reason, he was given $10,000 under the guise of stock purchases in his newspaper.

CIA
The CIA gave Figueres money to publish a political journal, Combate, and to sponsor the founding meeting of the Institute of Political Education in Costa Rica in November 1959. The institute was organized as a training school and a center for political collaboration for political parties of the democratic left, principally from Costa Rica, Cuba (in exile), the Dominican Republic (in exile), Guatemala, Honduras, Nicaragua (in exile), Panama, Peru, and Venezuela. The CIA concealed its role from most of the participants except Figueres. Its funds passed first to a shell foundation, then to the Kaplan Fund of New York, next to the Institute for International Labor Research (IILR) located in New York, and finally to San José. Socialist leader Norman Thomas headed the IILR. After the CIA connection was revealed, Thomas maintained that he had been unaware of it, but the IILR's treasurer, Sacha Volman, who also became treasurer of the institute in San José, was a CIA agent. The CIA used Volman to monitor the institute, and Cord Meyer collaborated directly with Figueres.

Figueres himself acknowledged in 1981 that he had received help from the Central Intelligence Agency, saying, "At the time, I was conspiring against the Latin American dictatorships and wanted help from the United States, I was a good friend of Allen Dulles," and, "The CIA's Cultural Department helped me finance a magazine and some youth conferences here. But I never participated in espionage. I did beg them not to carry out the Bay of Pigs Invasion of Cuba, which was madness, but they ignored me."

Cord Meyer came to San José sometime in the summer of 1960. He and Figueres formed the Inter-American Democratic Social Movement (INADESMO), which was nothing more than a front. A flier describing the idealistic purpose of INADESMO carried the same post office box as Figueres's personal letterhead. The INADESMO setup enabled Meyer to disburse funds more directly, without having to bother with conduits or the accounting procedures of the institute. For example, INADESMO contributed $10,000 to help finance the First Conference of Popular Parties of Latin America in Lima, Peru, in August 1960.

The following May, Meyer returned to San José for a more urgent purpose. In the wake of the Bay of Pigs failure, he provided Figueres with INADESMO funds to sponsor a meeting at his estate, 'La Lucha', from 12–20 May, between themselves and the leaders of the principal Dominican exile movements, Juan Bosch and Horacio Ornes. With Figueres as sponsor, Bosch and Ornes agreed to form a coalition government in anticipation of the overthrow of dictator Rafael Trujillo. As the United States moved to rally the hemisphere against Fidel Castro, Trujillo had become expendable, because the United States needed to demonstrate that it opposed all dictators, not just those on the left.

For over a year, the CIA had been in contact also with dissidents inside the Dominican Republic who argued that assassination was the only certain way to remove Trujillo. The CIA station in Ciudad Trujillo (now Santo Domingo) had encouraged dissidents and actually delivered to them three pistols and three carbines "attendant to their projected efforts to neutralize Trujillo." Because the Bay of Pigs failure created an uncertain situation, the United States tried to put the brakes on this operation and refused to pass along additional weapons to the dissidents which the Dominican station already had, specifically M-3 machine guns. The U.S. National Security Council, meeting on 5 May, "noted the President's view that the United States should not initiate the overthrow of Trujillo before [knowing] what government would succeed him."

On 30 May, Trujillo was ambushed and assassinated. The same "action group" with whom the CIA had been in contact and to whom it had delivered pistols and carbines carried out the attack. According to the 1975 report of the Church Committee, there was "no direct evidence" that CIA weapons had been used in the assassinations and the effect of the Bosch-Ornes pact upon the events that transpired remains a matter for speculation. Nonetheless, the CIA described its role in "changing" the government of the Dominican Republic "as a 'success' in that it assisted in moving the Dominican Republic from a totalitarian dictatorship to a Western-style democracy." Bosch himself was elected president of the Dominican Republic. Sacha Volman followed him there, establishing a new "research and publication center" and taking with him the CIA funding that used to go to Figueres in Costa Rica. Though one cannot prove that there was a coordinated link between the external and internal opposition groups, Cord Meyer was in a position to know what both elements were doing.

Relationship with Cuba
Figueres also opposed the dictatorial regime in pre-Castro Cuba and went so far as to dispatch a planeload of weapons for Cuban insurgents led by the young Fidel Castro, a member of Caribbean Legion. But soon after the 1959 success of the Cuban Revolution, he and Mr. Figueres had a falling out over the growth of Communist influence on the island. In March, 1959, Figueres was invited to Havana, and during a public speech, he warned Castro about the ideological deviations he had observed in Cuba, and immediately the microphone was taken from him. Figueres supported John F. Kennedy's Alliance for Progress but not the C.I.A.'s clandestine wars with Cuba.

Robert Vesco, fugitive U.S. financier 
Figueres was stubborn about his blunders, most notably his most controversial decision to grant asylum to Robert Vesco, the fugitive U.S. financier, accused of looting millions of dollars from the Investors Overseas Service, Ltd. (IOS) mutual funds in the 1970s. Mr. Vesco not only had a personal and business relationship with Mr. Figueres but he also made contributions to the campaign coffers of both leading political parties in the 1974 elections. Figueres made it clear, however, that he would not hesitate to extradite Vesco if the United States requested it. Figueres tried to intervene with president Jimmy Carter on Vesco's behalf. In the resulting political uproar in Costa Rica, Figueres' party lost the 1978 presidential election. Mr. Vesco fled Costa Rica after the Presidential elections of 1978 were won by Rodrigo Carazo, who had vowed to expel him.

In an interview in 1981, Figueres said that Vesco had "committed many stupidities" but added:

"I have always defended asylum and would protect him again if I could because I never abandon my friends. The only thing that pains me is that some friends thought I personally benefitted from Vesco."

Earlier, in a 1973 interview, Figueres said that he had been introduced to Vesco in Costa Rica in 1972 and that Vesco had then arranged for the investment of $2.15 million in Sociedad Agricola Industrial San Cristobal, S.A. The financially troubled company was founded by Figueres and owned by him and others. It had diverse operations in agriculture and its 3,000 employees made it the fourth-largest employer in Costa Rica.

Career after presidency
Figueres was well liked and received in many Latin American countries for his center-left ideals. He has been called one of the greatest contributors to social democracy.

After the presidency, as an acknowledged elder statesman, Figueres became a de facto ambassador for subsequent administrations.

Figueres backed the left-wing Nicaraguan Revolution that overthrew dictator Anastasio Somoza Debayle in 1979. He railed against U.S. policy when the United States supported Nicaragua's Contras.

A proposal by his supporters for a fourth presidential term in the 1980s was quickly crushed.

"This is an exemplary little country. We are the example for Latin America", Figueres told the Los Angeles Times in a 1986 interview. "In the next century, maybe everyone will be like us."

Private life
Figueres married Henrietta Boggs from the United States in 1941. They had two children, Muni and José Martí, before the marriage ended in divorce in 1954. He later married Karen Olsen Beck, also from the United States. They had four children: José María, Karen Christiana, Mariano and Kirsten. His wife was a member of the country's Legislative Assembly.

He was a good friend of the Governor of Puerto Rico, Luis Muñoz Marín, praising his political achievements in one of his essays.

His son, José María, also served as president from 1994 to 1998. His daughter, Muni Figueres Boggs, is the current Ambassador from Costa Rica to the United States. His other daughter, Christiana Figueres, is a Costa Rican diplomat who served from 2010 to 2016 as the Executive Secretary of the UN Framework Convention on Climate Change (UNFCCC), and is widely considered to be the architect of the Paris Agreement.

Awards
 : Order of Propitious Clouds (1973)

References

External links
International Jose Guillermo Carrillo Foundation
Costa Rica and the 1948 Revolution
Truman Library: Oral History Interview with Jose Figueres Ferrer, 8 July 1970

Further reading
 
  "Figueres best biographer" according to Mr. La Feber

 Costa Rica: Child in the Wind, 1988. (Video) (58 min.)
 A Bold Peace: Costa Rica's Path of Demilitarization, 2016. (Documentary film) (90 min.)

See also
Costa Rican Civil War

1906 births
1990 deaths
People from San Ramón, Costa Rica
Costa Rican people of Catalan descent
National Liberation Party (Costa Rica) politicians
Presidents of Costa Rica
Costa Rican revolutionaries
Male feminists
People of the Costa Rican Civil War
MIT School of Engineering alumni
Recipients of the Order of the Liberator General San Martin
Foreign ministers of Costa Rica
Costa Rican agnostics
Recipients of the Order of Propitious Clouds